The 2016 siege of Sur, also known as the Sur curfew took place as part of the Kurdish–Turkish conflict in Sur district of Diyarbakir in Turkey, lasting for more than 3 months and destroying much of the neighbourhood. Heavy artillery and machine gun fire was utilized in the city, in clashes between Turkish army and police vs the Kurdish militants. At least 25 people had been killed in Sur by early March 2016, with rights groups reporting more than 200 killed by the end of the siege on March 10. The HDP party said that most of the casualties were civilians.

Background
In August 2015, local Kurdish politicians announced autonomous self-rule in Sur, one of the several attempts of Kurdish autonomy in the region at the time. Turkish police used plastic bullets, teargas and water cannons against thousands of demonstrators protesting the curfew in Diyarbakır. Around the clock curfews were imposed on several towns in the region as a result. The curfew in Sur began on the 11 December 2015.

Timeline
On late February and early March 2016, Turkish police used plastic bullets, teargas and water cannons against thousands of demonstrators protesting the curfew in Diyarbakır. Human rights groups, NGOs, local trade organisations and EU parliamentarians have asked the Turkish authorities to allow for a 24-hour suspension of the curfew and the establishment of a humanitarian corridor, so that civilians still trapped inside embattled parts of Sur can safely be evacuated. Diyarbakır’s governor, agreed to suspend fire for one and a half hours on consecutive days in the city, during which the police used loudspeakers to demand everyone still left amid the ruined buildings to surrender, but many feared the consequences if they do.

Outcome
A report by Turkey's main opposition Republican People's Party, revealed that by late February 2016 about 80% of all buildings inside the Sur curfew zone had been destroyed, and that most people had left even the intact parts of the neighbourhood for fear of the violence. At least 25 people were killed in the siege of Sur, with rights groups claiming the death toll at more than 200. The HDP party claimed that most of the casualties in Sur were civilians.

See also

Siege of Silvan (2015)
2015 Diyarbakır rally bombing

References

2015 in Turkey
2016 in Turkey 
2010s in Diyarbakır
December 2015 events in Turkey
February 2016 events in Turkey
January 2016 events in Turkey
Kurdish–Turkish conflict (2015–present)
March 2016 events in Turkey
Sur
Sur
Sur
Military operations involving Turkey